|}

The Prix Quincey is a Group 3 flat horse race in France open to thoroughbreds aged four years or older. It is run at Deauville over a distance of 1,600 metres (about 1 mile), and it is scheduled to take place each year in late August.

History
The event was established in 1919, and it was originally called the Prix de la Plage Fleurie. It was named after the Plage Fleurie, the stretch of coastline where Deauville is located. The inaugural running was contested over 1,600 metres, but the distance was extended to 2,000 metres in 1920. It reverted to its original length the following year.

The race was renamed in memory of the Comte de Quincey (died 1924), a member of the Société d'Encouragement, in 1925. As the chief steward of this organisation, Quincey had instigated such decisions as the merger with the Société des Courses de Deauville and the creation of the Prix de l'Arc de Triomphe.

The Prix Quincey was cancelled twice during World War II, in 1940 and 1944. For the remainder of this period, while its regular venue was closed, the race was switched between Longchamp (1941–42, 1945) and Maisons-Laffitte (1943).

The race was originally open to three-year-olds. It was restricted to horses aged four or older from the 2018 running.

Records
Most successful horse (2 wins):
 Golden Hope – 1924, 1925
 Sultanabad – 1950, 1951
 Sparkler – 1971, 1972

Leading jockey (5 wins):
 Jean Deforge – Finarosa (1954), Dog and Cat (1955), Fairey Gannet (1960), Clarionneur (1961), Seawell (1964)
 Freddy Head – Discordia (1966), Bellypha (1979), Kilijaro (1980), Phydilla (1981), Go Milord (1989)

Leading trainer (7 wins):
 André Fabre – Tobin Lad (1987), Masterclass (1991), Dampierre (1992), Bon Point (1993), Devious Indian (2002), Fractional (2012), Graphite (2018)

Leading owner (4 wins):
 Jefferson Davis Cohn – Imaginaire (1919), King Arthur (1926), Lion Hearted (1929), Slipper (1930)
 Daniel Wildenstein – African Sky (1973), Liloy (1974), Heraldiste (1985), Dampierre (1992)

Winners since 1979

Earlier winners

 1919: Imaginaire
 1920: Sourbier
 1921: Bateau
 1922: Zariba
 1923: Select
 1924: Golden Hope
 1925: Golden Hope
 1926: King Arthur
 1927: Songe
 1928: Dickens
 1929: Lion Hearted
 1930: Slipper
 1931: Wood Violet
 1932: Ziani
 1933: Traghetto
 1934: Jocrisse
 1935: Tara
 1936: Pamina
 1937: Skylight
 1938: Miraculeux
 1939: Celticius
 1940: no race
 1941: Novalaise
 1942: Balthazar
 1943: Puymirol
 1944: no race
 1945:
 1946: Cuadrilla
 1947: Clarion
 1948: Damnos
 1949:
 1950: Sultanabad
 1951: Sultanabad
 1952:
 1953: Dynastie
 1954: Finarosa
 1955: Dog and Cat
 1956: Djanet
 1957: El Relicario
 1958: Baba au Rhum
 1959: Balleroy
 1960: Fairey Gannet
 1961: Clarionneur
 1962: Nice Guy
 1963: Crossen
 1964: Seawell
 1965: White Fire
 1966: Discordia
 1967: St Padarn
 1968: Presto
 1969: Habitat
 1970: Lorenzaccio
 1971: Sparkler
 1972: Sparkler
 1973: African Sky
 1974: Liloy
 1975: Brinkmanship
 1976: Ellora
 1977: Trepan
 1978: Lypheor

See also
 List of French flat horse races
 Recurring sporting events established in 1919 – this race is included under its original title, Prix de la Plage Fleurie.

References

 France Galop / Racing Post:

 france-galop.com – A Brief History: Prix Quincey.
 galopp-sieger.de – Prix Quincey.
 horseracingintfed.com – International Federation of Horseracing Authorities – Prix Quincey (2018).
 pedigreequery.com – Prix Quincey – Deauville.

Open mile category horse races
Deauville-La Touques Racecourse
Horse races in France